Darling Point ferry wharf is located on the southern side of Sydney Harbour serving the Sydney suburb of Darling Point.

Services
Darling Point wharf is served by peak-hour Sydney Ferries Double Bay services operated by First Fleet and SuperCat class ferries.

References

External links

Darling Point Wharf at Transport for New South Wales (Archived 11 June 2019)

Ferry wharves in Sydney
Darling Point, New South Wales